Jack Dorn Phillips (September 6, 1921 – August 30, 2009) was an American professional baseball player whose career extended from 1943 to 1959.

Early years
A native of Clarence, New York, Phillips graduated from Lancaster High School in 1939 and Clarkson University in 1943. He served in the US Navy during World War II.

Baseball career
Phillips entered the majors in 1947 with the New York Yankees, playing for them two and half years joining the Pittsburgh Pirates (1949–52) and Detroit Tigers (1955–57). His most productive season came in 1956 with the Tigers, when he posted career numbers in home runs (5), runs scored (25) and runs batted in (34), while hitting for a .293 average in 69 games. 
 
The highlight of Phillips’ career was his ultimate grand slam (a walk-off grand slam that erases a three-run deficit) on July 8, 1950, which he hit against the St. Louis Cardinals, with the ball tipping off the end of Stan Musial's glove as it went over the outfield fence. Through the end of the 2016 season, Phillips is one of just 28 players in major league history to hit an ultimate grand slam.
 
In a nine-season career, Phillips was a .283 hitter (252-for-892) in 343 games, including 111 runs, 101 RBIs, 42 doubles, 16 triples, nine home runs and five stolen bases.

A member of the 1947 World Champions New York Yankees, Phillips also earned Pacific Coast League MVP honors in 1954, after hitting .300 with 17 homers for Triple-A  Hollywood Stars. In 11 minor league seasons, he hit a combined .278in 1,212 games for five different teams between 1943 and 1959.

Later years
After a brief minor league managerial career, Phillips returned to Clarkson University where he devoted himself to coaching baseball, spanning 24 seasons as the Golden Knights’ skipper, amassing nearly 200 victories. In 1992, Phillips was inducted into the Clarkson University Athletic Hall of Fame. On May 3, 2008, Phillips was further honored when the Golden Knights renamed their baseball facility Jack Phillips Stadium at Snell Field.
 
Phillips died in 2009 in Chelsea, Michigan, at the age of 87.

References

Further reading
Jack Phillips biography from SABR
Clarkson Legend Jack Phillips Passes from the Clarkson Golden Knights

External links
, or Retrosheet

1921 births
2009 deaths
Baseball coaches from New York (state)
Baseball players from New York (state)
Buffalo Bisons (minor league) players
Chattanooga Lookouts managers
Clarkson Golden Knights baseball players
Clarkson University alumni
College baseball coaches
Detroit Tigers players
Hollywood Stars players
Major League Baseball first basemen
Minor league baseball managers
New York Yankees players
Newark Bears (IL) players
Norfolk Tars players
Pacific Coast League MVP award winners
People from Clarence, New York
Pittsburgh Pirates players
San Francisco Seals (baseball) players
United States Navy personnel of World War II